Noel Jones (11 December 1891 – 11 May 1948) was a New Zealand cricketer. He played in five first-class matches for Canterbury from 1918 to 1921.

See also
 List of Canterbury representative cricketers

References

External links
 

1891 births
1948 deaths
New Zealand cricketers
Canterbury cricketers
Cricketers from Christchurch